Oteruelo del Valle is a Spanish town of the province and community of Madrid, situated in the valley of Lozoya, exactly in the northwest of the province. The nearest villages are Alameda del Valle (1.4 km), Rascafría (2.3 km) and Pinilla del Valle (2.8 km). It was an independent township until 1975, but since then it is part of Rascafría, being considered as one of the nucleus of the population.

Historical development

From origins to the Middle Ages
The origin of Oteruelo del Valle and Rascafría dates back in the Middle Ages, and it is related to the repopulation of the mountains of the valley. This territory that was part of Toledo was deserted, so that the councils could have it available freely, in exchange of several military services. Consequently, those territories were repopulated in a large number.

16th, 17th and 18th centuries
At that time, Rascafría and Oteruelo were unattached places, belonging to the Community of Segovia. There were 49 neighbours and 64 houses in Oteruelo, all of them established in the urban nucleus of the village. The main activity of people in there was the sheep stockbreeding and (despite it was less remarkable) the agriculture was also an important activity for them.
There are little constructions that persist in time until nowadays, that´s why we should stand out the most singular building in Oteruelo, La Iglesia de Nuestra Señora de la Paz. It was damaged during the Civil War in 1936 and reconstructed in 1944 by the architect Rodolfo García-Pablos.

19th and 20th centuries
After the provincial restructuring made in 1833, either in Rascafría or Oteruelo, which were part of Segovia, turned to belong to the province of Madrid. The vegetative growth continued increasing and their principal source of income kept being the cattle industry and agriculture, with a minimum industrial activity. 
In 1975 the township of Oteruelo disappeared and annexed to Rascafría, which enhanced its population up to 1,218 people. However, before Oteruelo joined Rascafría, the number of residents living there was just 208 people, who made a living working in different posts.
Among the edifices built in that period, the schools, situated in the northern part of the village, next to the road should be mentioned.

21st century
At present, instead of the schools, there is the Sala Permanente Luis Feito, where there are shown many works of the author.

Climate
It is surrounded by the Montes Carpetanos, Sierra de la Morcuera (east) and Cuerda Larga (south), and due to that it has many special climatic characteristics. Thanks to the "barrier effect" caused by Sierra de Guadarrama, which has points up to 2000 m, Oteruelo del Valle enjoys climatic parameters clearly different from other zones of the Castilian meseta. According to that information, the precipitation is very abundant and temperatures are less warm. That climate allows different species from the northwest part of Madrid live there, which are typical mostly in the peninsular centre.

Places of interest
In this locality the highlight could be the bell gable of the church. There is a clear mixture between new and old buildings, as the village shows. It also offers beautiful and pleasing roads which are very relaxing to walk through. In the entry of the village there is an ancient big chariot that is next to the "Medio Ambiente" building from the Community of Madrid.

Luis Feito
One of the peculiarities of this village is the connection it has with the artist Luis Feito. There is a room at the entrance of this township which shows a big part of the recent graphic works made by this painter, who belongs to La Real Academia de Bellas Artes de San Fernando. He also founded the group El Paso junto a Millares, Sauca y Canogar, amongst others.

Different works of etching from Peñalara can be taken into account in this man´s works, as well as many silk-screen paintings from Rascafría (2002) and Oteruelo (2002).

Due to the familiar and affective correlation Feito has with the place and in general with the Valle of Lozoya, the artist donated many of his works to the neighbours of Oteruelo del Valle, with the aim of making his graphics works samples of the village in the near future.

Travel

By road
The village is situated in the highway M-604, to which you can gain access from:

Exit ramp 69 of the   A-1  (Dual Carriageway of the North) .
Road M-611 from Miraflores de la Sierra. It leads into the road M-604, 2 km away from Oteruelo del Valle.
Road M-601/CL-601 in the pick of the pass of Navacerrada.

By bus
194 communicates Oteruelo del Valle with Madrid and some other villages from the A-1.
194A communicates Oteruelo del Valle with Buitrago del Lozoya.
Both lines link this locality with Rascafría and other townships crossed by the road M-604.

Towns in Spain
Populated places in the Community of Madrid
Sistema Central